Vauxhall Park is a suburb in east Luton, in the Luton district, in the ceremonial county of Bedfordshire, England. The area is roughly bounded by Crawley Green Road to the north, London Luton Airport to the south, the Vauxhall Way to the west, and Wigmore Lane to the east.

History
The area was historically the site of Eaton Green Farm, which today is commemorated in Eaton Green Road which runs through the area. The area was built up in the 1950s as part of the rapid post-war growth of Luton. It was named Vauxhall Park after the Vauxhall Motors factory which was nearby at the time, now the site of neighbouring Napier Park.

Local area
The area is mainly residential, with a small shopping precinct at its centre on Lyneham Road. Vauxhall Park has a church on Carteret Road, St. Francis Parish Church, and a community centre on Raynham Way.

The south of the area consists of many industrial buildings and businesses close to the airport, part of the Luton Enterprise Zone.

Politics
Vauxhall Park is split between Crawley and Wigmore wards. The wards form part of the parliamentary constituency of Luton South and the MP is Rachel Hopkins (Labour).

Local attractions

Local newspapers
Two weekly newspapers cover Vauxhall Park, although they are not specific to the area. 

They are the:
 Herald and Post
 Luton News

References

External links
 Luton Borough Council

Areas of Luton